The 1909 Tour de France was the 7th edition of Tour de France, one of cycling's Grand Tours. The Tour began in Paris on 5 July and Stage 8 occurred on 19 July with a flat stage from Nîmes. The race finished in Paris on 1 August.

Stage 8
19 July 1909 — Nîmes to Toulouse,

Stage 9
21 July 1909 — Toulouse to Bayonne,

Stage 10
23 July 1909 — Bayonne to Bordeaux,

Stage 11
25 July 1909 — Bordeaux to Nantes,

Stage 12
27 July 1909 — Nantes to Brest,

Stage 13
29 July 1909 — Brest to Caen,

Stage 14
1 August 1909 — Caen to Paris,

References

1909 Tour de France
Tour de France stages